cNote is a 2005 National Film Board of Canada animated short by Christopher Hinton, which received the Genie Award for Best Animated Short at the 26th Genie Awards. In this visual music short, Hinton animates to an original modern classical composition by Montreal-based composer Michael Oesterle.

Influenced by Futurism and Abstract expressionism, the film was computer animated and represented a departure for Hinton, who generally used traditional animation techniques.

References

External links
 Watch cNote at NFB.ca
 

2005 short films
National Film Board of Canada animated short films
Animated films without speech
Visual music
Abstract animation
Quebec films
Computer-animated short films
Films directed by Christopher Hinton
Best Animated Short Film Genie and Canadian Screen Award winners
2005 animated films
2005 films
2000s animated short films
Animated musical films
Canadian animated short films
Canadian musical films
2000s musical films
2000s English-language films
2000s Canadian films